Markham, Virginia may refer to:

Markham, Fauquier County, Virginia
Markham, Pittsylvania County, Virginia